Holy Family Hospital  may refer to:

Holy Family Hospital, Rawalpindi, Pakistan
 Holy Family Hospital, Karachi, Pakistan
 Holy Family Hospital, Mumbai, India
 Holy Family Hospital (New Delhi), India
 Holy Family Hospital (Methuen), Methuen, Massachusetts, part of the Steward Health Care System 
 Holy Family Hospital (Spokane), Spokane, Washington
 Holy Family Hospital (Bethlehem), Bethlehem, Palestine